The Nesselsdorf type B is a veteran automobile manufactured by Nesselsdorfer Wagenbau-Fabriks-Gesellschaft A.G. (NW, now known as Tatra). Initially two cars were made under name Neuer Vierer (New Fourseater) in year 1901, but later the same car was manufactured under the name type B in 1902 - 1904 (36 made). In 1904 also another variant of the design was made (8 pieces). 

The car was initially a four-seater, but later also other variants were made (including 6-seater). The car had rectangular frame, 12 horsepower engine located under the floor, in front of the rear axle. The fuel tank, reservoir for the coolant as well as the radiator were located under the front hood. The steering column with a steering wheel was inclined. The subsequent types C, D, E, F were produced in small numbers. Apart from the E they had flat-four water-cooled engines, transversely mounted, directly under the driver's floorboard.

References

Cars of the Czech Republic
Tatra vehicles
Cars introduced in 1901
1900s cars
Veteran vehicles

Rear mid-engine, rear-wheel-drive vehicles